Felipe Enrique Neri (born Philip Hendrik Nering Bögel; November 23, 1759 in Paramaribo, Surinam – 23 February 1827) was a Dutch businessman and land owner known for his money in Anglo-American settlement of Texas.

Early life and family
Philip Hendrik Nering Bögel was the son of Conraed Laurens Nering Bögel and Maria Jacoba Kraayvanger. In 1764, the family moved to the Netherlands and Philip later joined the cavalry. He married Lady Georgine Wolffeline Françoise Lijcklama à Nyeholt in Oldeboorn, Friesland on April 28, 1782. They settled in Leeuwarden, where Neri worked as a tax collector on land and houses. The couple had five children.

Flight to North America
In 1793 Nering was accused of using tax funds for personal gain. The province put a reward of 1,000 ducats on his head. Via Hamburg - using the pseudonym Bastrop - Philip arrived in Philadelphia with wife and children before the end of the year. Around 1800 they lived in Frederick County, Maryland; before 1804 his wife and daughters returned to the Netherlands. Around 1806 he lived in San Antonio, Texas. In Spanish Louisiana Neri introduced himself as a Dutch nobleman, Baron de Bastrop who had fled the country because of the French invasion. People believed his false identity, and Bastrop was soon engaged in many land deals where he made a fortune but later went broke. He received permission from Spain to form a colony in the Ouachita River valley. His contract with Spanish colonial governor Francisco Luis Héctor de Carondelet provided for European settlement of 850,000 acres on the Ouachita. Although ninety-nine colonists settled in the area, the project was halted when Louisiana realized its government treasury did not have enough funds to see the colonization to fruition.

Career in Texas
When Louisiana's sale from France to the United States was finalized, he moved to Texas and received a permit to establish a colony between Bexar and the Trinity River.
He moved to San Antonio in 1806, where he posed as a loyal subject who strongly opposed the sale of Louisiana to the USA. In 1810 he was appointed second alcalde, (mayor or chief judicial official), of the Spanish town.

In 1820, Neri met with Moses Austin, whose request to bring Anglo-American settlers into Texas had recently been rejected. He had been acquainted with Moses Austin, having formerly shared the hospitality of a roadhouse in then-Spanish Missouri with Moses 20 years before he came to Texas. Neri used his influence to help Moses Austin, and later Stephen F. Austin obtain grants to bring Anglo-American settlers into Texas, later to be called the Old Three Hundred.

In 1820, Neri was chosen to be commissioner of colonization for Stephen F. Austin’s colony. In 1823, he was elected to the provincial deputation of San Antonio, and later the Legislature of Coahuila y Tejas in 1824. Until his death on February 23, 1827, he served the legislature. At the end of his life he lived in Saltillo. He did not leave enough money for his burial, so other legislative members paid for it. In his will, he left land to his wife and children in the Netherlands. Years later, his true identity was revealed.

Legacy

Neri was a very important and influential person in the colonization of Texas. Without him, Texas might have never been populated with Anglo-American settlers.

The following places are all named after him:

 Bastrop, Louisiana
 Bastrop County, Texas
 Bastrop, Texas
 De Bastrop Township, Ashley County, Arkansas

References

Sources
Moore, Richard W. Bastrop, Baron de, Handbook of Texas Online.
The Baron de Bastrop, The Institute of Texan Cultures
Rogers, Tex; American History, The Old 300, Electric Scotland
Bastrop, Lone Star Internet
Felipe Henique Neri Baron de Bastrop, Flickr.com

1759 births
1827 deaths
People from Paramaribo
People from San Antonio
People of Spanish Texas
People of Mexican Texas
18th-century Dutch businesspeople
18th-century Surinamese people
19th-century Surinamese people
Bastrop County, Texas